The Dundee Township Park District provides park areas, open spaces, recreational facilities and services in the Dundee Township of Kane County, Illinois, United States. It serves the communities of Carpentersville, East Dundee, West Dundee, Sleepy Hollow, and portions of Elgin, Barrington Hills, Hoffman Estates, Gilberts and Algonquin.

Services
The Dundee Township Park District offers a wide variety of services to both residents and non-residents of Dundee Township.

Senior center
The senior center is located at 665 Barrington Ave in Carpentersville. It offers classes, programs, special events, day trips, extended tours and social clubs for adults aged 50 or older. It was built in 2003 and provides its services six days a week.

Golf courses
The Park District has two 18-hole public golf courses, Bonnie Dundee and Randall Oaks. It was built in 1924 by architect C. D. Wegstaff. It has a clubhouse and banquet room. It has two practice facilities, two putting greens, a clubhouse, and a 3-hole Acorn family course.

Athletics
The Park District's athletic programs provide competitive programs within different leagues and clubs, as well as learning programs that teach basic skills for various sports.

Camps
The Park District camps provide activities for children in arts and crafts, field trips, special events, and other activities.

Early childhood
The Park District offers a preschool/pre-kindergarten and child care center, helping to prepare children for kindergarten.

Governing body
The Board of Commissioners governs the Dundee Township Park District.  It is composed of five elected officials who represent their community. Its current members are: 
Frank Scarpelli - President
Jim Bonkoski - Vice President
Erin Peterson - Secretary
John Meschewski - Treasurer
Craig Rakow - Commissioner

History
The Park District was established in 1952. It followed a referendum campaign motivated by the need to have a permanent administrative body to oversee the operation of Edmund Haeger Memorial Pool, which was located in Lions Park.

One of the first buildings that the District operated was the Besinger Community Center, which opened on December 26, 1959. This housed the Park District’s senior center before construction of its replacement began in 2002.

In 1962, voters approved a bond issue of $225,000 to build Thresher Pool. L.W. Besinger donated the land for the pool and the pool was opened on July 2, 1963. In December 1963, the Park District announced plans to construct a golf course and open a park site on Randall Road. The park opened in 1964 and was dedicated as Randall Oaks Park. Its facilities included a petting zoo, which still operates. Randall Oaks Golf Course was opened in September 1965 and its18-hole course completed in June 1966.

In 1971, the Park District purchased Library Hall, an historical building constructed in 1895. This became the Administrative Offices of the District and remains so. In 1972, the Park District purchased the Sleepy Hollow pool for the cost of $120,000. Private interests had previously operated this pool. In 1986 the pool was renovated to include a new filtration system and a zero depth entry area.

In the late 1970s, the Park District received grant funds to purchase an additional  to add to the existing  Randall Oaks Park.

In 1982, a community building was constructed and dedicated to Al Price, whose family owned and operated the farm prior to the Park District’s purchase.

Construction on a  recreation center stated in July 1988. The center's pool was completed in early July 1989, and the building was opened to the public that September. In 1993, the Park District completed construction of Dolphin Cove Family Aquatic Center. The water park contains two large flume slides and two smaller slides, a sand volleyball court, concession center and a sand play area. The water park connects to the recreation center's pool.

In 1988, a $200,000 grant from the Illinois Department of Natural Resources was obtained for projects at Randall Oaks Park. A community picnic shelter, playground, basketball court and trails were built. More recently, baseball and football fields have been added to the park.

On November 5, 1991, voters approved a $4.9 million bond issue to purchase Bonnie Dundee Golf Course. The Park District began operation on the course in 1992. In 1995 the course was renovated to include an underground irrigation system and an additional parking area on the golf course grounds.

On November 3, 1992, voters approved a $1.5 million referendum to purchase  of wooded property that was part of an old racetrack. The Kane County Forest Preserve District agreed to purchase an adjoining . Since that time, nearly $100,000 has been spent on restoration work at raceway woods.

In summer 2000, development of Prairie Meadow Park was completed in West Dundee. The park has an in-line/ice skating rink, playground, picnic shelter, basketball court and soccer fields. A $200,000 grant from the Illinois Department of Natural Resources was secured for this project. A cooperative venture with School District #300 was agreed upon in the winter of 2001. The park district contributed funds to enlarge gyms to provide additional programming areas, at two of the new schools being constructed.

The construction of a new senior center began in 2002. It developed as an addition to the recreation center. This center includes a large multi-purpose room with a state, arts and crafts room, library and computer room, and offices. The center was completed in 2003.

Park list

References

Mann, Dave. Land plan causes stir in Dundee Township Park district wants parcel for soccer fields. Daily Herald (Arlington Heights, IL) May 9, 2002
  Burnett, Sara. Dundee Township Park District: The $14 million question. Daily Herald. March 28, 2001

External links
Official Website
General Information at official website
Bonnie Dundee Golf Course
Randall Oaks Golf Course

Park districts in Illinois
Protected areas of Kane County, Illinois
Algonquin, Illinois
1952 establishments in Illinois